Hiraka is a word of Japanese origin that may refer to:

Hiraka, Akita, a town in Japan
Hiraka, Aomori, a city in Japan
Hiraka Station, principal railway station of the city
Hiraka District, Akita, a former Japanese rural district
Yurina Hiraka (born 1991), Japanese long jumper

Japanese-language surnames